Sailing at the 2015 Island Games was held at St Aubin's Bay, Jersey from 28 June to 2 July.

Medal Table

Results

References 

2015 Island Games
2015